The discography of American singer-songwriter Kevin Rudolf, consists of three studio albums, twenty-six singles and nine music videos.

Albums

Studio albums

Singles

As lead artist

As featured artist

Guest appearances

Music videos

Production credits
2005
 "Thinking of You" (David Banner)
2006
 "Say It Right" (Nelly Furtado)
 "Scream" (Timbaland feat. Keri Hilson and Nicole Scherzinger)
 "Release" (Timbaland feat. Justin Timberlake)
 "My Style" (The Black Eyed Peas feat. Justin Timberlake)
2008
 "Let It Rock" (Kevin Rudolf feat. Lil Wayne)
 "Something About You" (Kevin Lyttle)
2009
 "Good Girls Go Bad" (Cobra Starship feat. Leighton Meester)
 "Love Letter" (Leona Lewis)
 "Beat Me Up" (Allison Iraheta)
 "Halfway Gone" (Lifehouse)
 "Falling In" (Lifehouse)
 "Late Night Automatic" (Three-6-Mafia)
 "Hot Mess" (Cobra Starship)
 "One Way Trip" (Lil Wayne feat. Kevin Rudolf)
 "I Want It All" (Birdman feat. Lil Wayne & Kevin Rudolf)
 "Better Than Her" (Matisse)
 "Paradice" (Lil Wayne)
2010
 "I Made It (Cash Money Heroes)" (Kevin Rudolf feat. Jay Sean, Lil Wayne & Birdman)
 "Just Say So" (Brian McFadden feat. Kevin Rudolf)
 "Ghost" (Fefe Dobson)
 "Round & Round" (Selena Gomez & The Scene)
 "Oh Yeah" (B.T.R.)
 "City Is Ours" (B.T.R.)
 "On and On" (Flo Rida feat. Kevin Rudolf)
 "All I Need" (Natasha Bedingfield feat. Kevin Rudolf)
 "The World Belongs To Me"  (My Darkest Days)
2011
 "One Night" (Jesse McCartney)
 "I Think She Likes Me" (Jesse McCartney)
 "Coming Back Down"  (Hollywood Undead)
 "Levitate"  (Hollywood Undead)
 "Don't Cry Now"  (Makeba Riddick)
 "Love2Baby"  (Christian TV)
 "Always Rain"  (Jared Evan feat. Kevin Rudolf)
 "Grow Up" (Cher Lloyd feat. Busta Rhymes)
 "A Million Lights" (DJ Khaled feat. [Kevin Rudolf Tyga Jae Millz Mack Maine Cory Gunz])
2013
 "Little Bit of Everything" (Keith Urban)
 "Different for Girls" (Gavin Degraw)
 "Leading Man"  (Gavin Degraw)

Musician credits

References

External links
Official Site
Kevin Rudolf at MySpace
Kevin Rudolf's Virtual Wasteland

Discographies of American artists
 
 
Rock music discographies
Pop music discographies
Production discographies